Zina Antonovna Kushniruk (born January 5, 1962 in Velyki Viknyny) is a Ukrainian journalist and editor. Honored Journalist of Ukraine (2003).

Biography 
She graduated from the Faculty of Philology of the Ternopil Pedagogical Institute (1983).

In 1984-1995 - in the editorial office of the regional newspaper "Free Life". Since 1995 - columnist, head of the editorial department of the newspaper "Freedom", the leading page of the "Gnezdyshko". In September 2007-2013 - editor of the newspaper "Freedom". Since 2013, he has been the editor-in-chief of the Nash Den newspaper.

Own correspondent of the medical newspaper of Ukraine "Your health". Author of numerous publications in all-Ukrainian publications.

References

Sources 
 Григорій Грещук, Кушнірук Зіна Антонівна // Тернопільський енциклопедичний словник: у 4 т. / редкол.: Г. Яворський та ін., Тернопіль: Видавничо-поліграфічний комбінат «Збруч», 2005, Т. 2: К–О, s. 307–308, ISBN 966-528-199-2.

Living people
1962 births
Ukrainian journalists
Ukrainian women journalists
Ukrainian editors
Ukrainian women editors